Sudhanshu Saria is an Indian filmmaker. Born in the tea estates of Darjeeling, India, he attended The Doon School and graduated from Ithaca College in New York, with a degree in Bachelor of Fine Arts in Film and Photography. He made his directorial debut with the 2015 romantic drama Loev. Saria won a National Film Award for directing the short film Knock, Knock, Knock.

Career
Early in his career, Saria served as a development and acquisitions executive for various companies including ThinkFilm, New Films International and Peace Arch Entertainment where he was tasked with acquiring and developing projects for the companies to finance and distribute. Saria founded his own production house, Four Line Films.

Saria's short film, entitled His New Hands, had its world premiere in competition at the 2014 Hong Kong International Film Festival, and was awarded the prestigious Remi Gold Prize for Best Dramatic Short at the WorldFest-Houston International Film Festival and the Best Film prize at Flyway Film Festival. The film screened at more than twenty-five film festivals around the world including Sarasota Film Festival, Omaha Film Festival and the Oscar qualifying Heartland Film Festival. It was selected by the makers of the RED camera for its annual showcase of the best films shot on this device, and awarded the Best Cinematography prize at the Kala Ghoda Arts Festival in Mumbai.

Saria's feature film directorial debut Loev, an indie road film for which he also served as the screenwriter, premiered in the First Feature competition at the Tallinn Black Nights Film Festival and has been selected at prestigious festivals all around the world including SXSW, Guadalajara International Film Festival, Frameline Film Festival, Jeonju International Film Festival, Inside Out Film and Video Festival and BFI Flare: London LGBT Film Festival Film Festivals. In India, the film had its premiere in the India Gold competition section at MAMI Mumbai Film Festival and then at the International Film Festival of Kerala. The film has received rave reviews and secured theatrical distribution in key territories around the world. It also won the Audience Award for Best Film at the TLVFest - the LGBT International Film Festival in Tel Aviv. The film was produced by Saria in partnership with Bombay Berlin Film Productions. The film was acquired by Netflix for an exclusive worldwide release and was debuted on their platform on 1 May 2017.

Saria's second feature-length screenplay, I Am Here was selected for the International Film Finance Forum at the Toronto International Film Festival, and is currently in pre-production in partnership with Cinestaan Film Company.

Saria's next was Knock Knock Knock, a psychological thriller set in Darjeeling. The film world premiered as one of five shorts selected from around the world in the Shorts Showcase of the 2019 Busan International Film Festival. The film had its European premiere at the 2019 Tallinn Black Nights Film Festival in their Homecoming section alongside new films by Peter Strickland and Yorgos Lanthimos. The film won the Remi-Gold for Best Live Action Short at WorldFest Houston and the Best Screenplay award at the New York Indian Film Festival. The film had its India premiere at Dharamsala International Film Festival and has been traveling to various cities around the world. He wrote, directed and edited the film besides producing it in partnership with California Studios. The film was acquired by MUBI and premiered on their platform in September 2020. The film was picked by Platform Magazine in its annual Best of 2020 list. It was also included in Juggernaut's list of the Best South Asian films of the year, and in 2021 it won the best non-feature direction award at the 67th National Film Awards.

Saria is currently in production on Sanaa, a feature film starring Radhika Madan, Shikha Talsania, Sohum Shah and Pooja Bhatt in lead parts. Besides writing and directing the film, Saria is also producing the feature under his production house Four Line Films.

Saria also served on the Juries for the First Features and the Estonian Film competition sections of the 20th Tallinn Black Nights Film Festival. He has also served on various panels focused around film production and distribution including Blackberry's panel on crowdfunding at the Toronto International Film Festival and The State of Diversity in Independent Film at SXSW. He also lectured in an online masterclass on The Art of Pitching for Mumbai Film Festival.

He is also in development on Masoom, a young adult drama series for Amazon Prime as well as writing and co-producing the third season of Netflix's Emmy winning, true-crime drama series Delhi Crime. He is also attached to direct ULAJH, an espionage thriller for Junglee Pictures.

References

External links

Year of birth missing (living people)
Living people
People from Darjeeling
Film producers from West Bengal
The Doon School alumni
Ithaca College alumni